Gabriel Green may refer to:
 Gabriel Green (ufologist)
 Gabriel Green (fighter)